The National Hero of Azerbaijan is the highest national title in the Republic of Azerbaijan. The title was named on 25 March 1992, and the "Qizil Ulduz" Medal awarded as a sign of receiving this title was established by a separate law in 15 July 1992. The law on the title has been in effect since 25 December 1995. It can only be awarded once to the same person.

The title is awarded for outstanding services of national importance to Azerbaijan in defence and strengthening of the state system and creation of important national values.

Independent Azerbaijan

After the break-up of the Soviet Union in 1991, Azerbaijan and Armenia were engaged in the First Nagorno-Karabakh War in which several Azerbaijanis were awarded with the National Hero of Azerbaijan.

Recipients

 Mubariz Ibrahimov 
 Maharram Seyidov
 Albert Agarunov
 Kerim Kerimov
 Riad Ahmadov
 Amiraslan Aliyev
 Ali Mammadov
 Emin Aliyev
 Mirasgar Seyidov
 Ibrahim Mammadov
 Mikayil Jabrayilov
 Nadir Aliyev
 Salatyn Asgarova
 Sayavush Hasanov
 Allahverdi Bagirov
 Faig Jafarov
 Eldar Mammadov
 Bahruz Mansurov
 Chingiz Mustafayev
 Ali Mustafayev
 Asif Maharramov
 Alif Hajiyev
 Shahin Taghiyev
 Yusif Mirzayev
 Zakir Majidov
 Ruslan Polovinko
 Javanshir Rahimov
 Murad Mirzayev
 Shukur Hamidov
 Samid Imanov
 Mazahir Rustamov
 Chingiz Gurbanov
 Anvar Arazov
 Anatoly Davidovich
 Isgender Aznaurov
 Aytakin Mammadov
 Ilham Aliyev

References

External links

 Heroes of the USSR  Savash-az.com.

Orders, decorations, and medals of Azerbaijan
Honorary titles of Azerbaijan
Hero
Awards established in 1992
 
1992 establishments in Azerbaijan
Hero (title)